Gauze is a thin, translucent fabric with a loose open weave.

Gauze may also refer to:

Gauze (band), Japanese hardcore punk band
Gauze (album), Dir En Grey album
"Gauze", song by Deftones from album Koi No Yokan